Tragiella is a genus of plant of the family Euphorbiaceae first described as a genus in 1919. It is native to Africa.

Species
 Tragiella anomala (Prain) Pax & K.Hoffm. - Tanzania, Malawi, Zambia
 Tragiella frieseana (Prain) Pax & K.Hoffm. - Zambia
 Tragiella natalensis (Sond.) Pax & K.Hoffm. - South Sudan, Kenya, Tanzania, Uganda, Malawi, Mozambique, Zimbabwe, Cape Province, KwaZulu-Natal, Limpopo, Mpumalanga 
 Tragiella pyxostigma Radcl.-Sm. - Tanzania

formerly included
moved to Dalechampia 
Tragiella pavoniifolia Chiov. - Dalechampia pavoniifolia (Chiov.) M.G.Gilbert - Somalia

References

Euphorbiaceae genera
Plukenetieae
Flora of Africa